13062 Podarkes  is a mid-sized Jupiter trojan from the Greek camp, approximately  in diameter. It was discovered on 19 April 1991, by American astronomer couple Carolyn and Eugene Shoemaker at the Palomar Observatory, California. The dark Jovian asteroid is the principal body of the proposed Podarkes family. It was named after Podarkes from Greek mythology.

Orbit and classification 

The orbit of this Trojan asteroid is unstable. It is orbiting in the leading Greek camp at Jupiter's  Lagrangian point, 60° ahead of its orbit (see Trojans in astronomy). It orbits the Sun at a distance of 5.1–5.2 AU once every 11 years and 9 months (4,283 days; semi-major axis of 5.16 AU). Its orbit has an eccentricity of 0.01 and an inclination of 8° with respect to the ecliptic. The first used precoveries were taken by Spacewatch of the Steward Observatory at Kitt Peak, extending the asteroid's observation arc by just two weeks prior to its discovery.

Podarkes family 

Fernando Roig and Ricardo Gil-Hutton identified Podarkes as the principal body of a small Jovian asteroid family, using the hierarchical clustering method (HCM), which looks for groupings of neighboring asteroids based on the smallest distances between them in the proper orbital element space. According to the astronomers, the Podarkes family belongs to the larger Menelaus clan, an aggregation of Jupiter trojans which is composed of several families, similar to the Flora family in the inner asteroid belt.

However this family is not included in David Nesvorný HCM-analysis from 2014. Instead, Podarkes is listed as a non-family asteroid of the Jovian background population on the Asteroids Dynamic Site (AstDyS) which based on another analysis by Milani and Knežević.

Naming 

This minor planet is named after the Greek warrior Podarkes from Greek mythology, who took 40 ships to the Trojan War. He is the son of Ares and brother of Protesilaos, after whom the Jupiter trojan, 3540 Protesilaos, is named. Protesilaos was the first Greek to set foot on the shores of Troy and to die in the war. The official naming citation was published by the Minor Planet Center on 13 October 2000.

Physical characteristics 

According to the survey carried out by the NEOWISE mission of NASA's space-based Wide-field Infrared Survey Explorer, Podarkes measures 28.96 kilometers in diameter, and its surface has an albedo of 0.084, while a generic diameter estimate, based on an absolute magnitude of 11.1 and an albedo at 0.05 gives a larger diameter of approximately 40 kilometers. As of 2018, no rotational lightcurve of Podarkes has been obtained from photometric observations. The body's rotation period, pole and shape remain unknown.

References

External links 
 Asteroid Lightcurve Database (LCDB), query form (info )
 Dictionary of Minor Planet Names, Google books
 Asteroids and comets rotation curves, CdR – Observatoire de Genève, Raoul Behrend
 Discovery Circumstances: Numbered Minor Planets (10001)-(15000) – Minor Planet Center
 Asteroid 13062 Podarkes at the Small Bodies Data Ferret
 
 

013062
Discoveries by Eugene Merle Shoemaker
Discoveries by Carolyn S. Shoemaker
Named minor planets
19910419